A lock-up period, also known as a lock in, lock out, or locked up period, is a predetermined amount of time following an initial public offering where large shareholders, such as company executives and investors representing considerable ownership, are restricted from selling their shares. 
Generally, a lock-up period is a condition of exercising an employee stock option.  Depending on the company, the IPO lock-up period typically lasts between 90 and 180 days before these shareholders are allowed the right, but not the obligation, to exercise the option.

Lockups are designed to prevent insiders from liquidating assets too quickly after a company goes public. When employees and pre-IPO investors initially get their shares or options, they sign a contract with the company that typically prohibits trades for the first 90–180 days after a future IPO. When the company is ready to go public, the underwriting bank then reaffirms the existing agreements in new contracts. This helps to ensure the market will not disproportionately increase the supply, which drives prices downward. While lockups used to be simple—usually lasting 180 days for everyone—they have become increasingly complex.

Usually employees and early investors want shorter lockups (so they can cash out sooner) while the underwriting banks want longer ones (to keep insiders from flooding the market and sinking the share price). The company is often somewhere in the middle—wanting to keep employees and investors happy but not wanting it to look like insiders don't have faith in it.

References

Stock market
Investment